The New England Forest Rally is a performance rally event in New Hampshire and Maine, United States. Originally known as the Maine Forest Rally, it first appeared in 1991 as a winter rally. In the past, the event was part of the SCCA ProRally and Rally America schedule, now it is sanctioned by the American Rally Association.

The event is held mainly on logging roads with some of the longest stages in North America rallying. As the event is held during July, the road conditions are often dry and dusty.

In 1994 the Maine Summer Rally was added. The event ran as a 60% National/Divisional and as a full National event starting in 1995. In 1996 an in-town spectator stage was added to the summer event to the delight of the spectators. The most recent in-town stages, held at the Mexico Recreation Area, have featured a 1 meter high man-made jump.

At its peak, the Maine Forest Rally had the highest number of starting cars in the SCCA ProRally series. The 2001 event, with 121 National and ClubRally starting teams, broke the 111 car starting record held by the 2000 Maine Forest Rally. As a bellwether of the event's success, it was voted the SCCA's ProRally of the Year in 1992 and again in 2001.

In 2007, the name of the event was changed to the New England Forest Rally to better reflect the continued growth of the event by expanding to include stages in the city of Berlin, New Hampshire.

Notable competitors
The 1999 event saw 1984 World Rally Champion Stig Blomqvist drive the late Carl Merrill's Ford Escort Cosworth to victory over 83 National and Divisional teams.

In 2007, freestyle motocross star turned rally driver Travis Pastrana drove a Subaru Rally Team USA WRX STi to victory.

Ken Block, co-founder of DC Shoe Co. and rally driver competed at the New England Forest Rally regularly.

John Buffum, the most successful American-born rally driver ever, is a key organizer of the event, and in 2008, he drove his Group B Audi Quattro on the first stage of the event.

Past winners

External links
New England Forest Rally
New England Forest Rally subpage at American Rally Association
New England Forest Rally subpage at Sunday River
(1991-2008)

References

Rally competitions in the United States
Motorsport in Maine
Motorsport in New Hampshire
Rally America